Dichomeris amauropis is a moth in the family Gelechiidae. It was described by Edward Meyrick in 1923. It is found in Peru.

The forewings are fuscous. The stigmata is small, dark fuscous, the plical beneath the first discal, edged posteriorly by a whitish dot. There is a marginal series of dark fuscous dots around the apex and termen. The hindwings are dark grey.

References

Moths described in 1923
amauropis